WPXC-TV (channel 21) is a television station licensed to Brunswick, Georgia, United States, broadcasting the Ion Television network to the Jacksonville, Florida area. It is the only major commercial station in the Jacksonville market that is licensed in Georgia. The station is owned and operated by the Ion Media subsidiary of the E.W. Scripps Company, and has studios on Blythe Island Highway/State Route 303 in southwestern Brunswick; its transmitter is located in unincorporated southwestern Camden County, Georgia (northwest of Kingsland).

History
The station was granted a construction permit by the Federal Communications Commission (FCC) on December 28, 1987. The station first signed on the air on April 2, 1990, as WBSG-TV. Originally operating as an independent station, the station became a charter affiliate of The WB upon its launch on January 11, 1995. However, WBSG struggled financially, and on August 2, 1996, the station's owner, Coastal Com Inc., entered into a local marketing agreement with the Allbritton Communications Company, set to take effect on September 1; Coastal Com had earlier planned to sell WBSG to Allbritton outright for $10 million. Allbritton was planning to sign on Orange Park-licensed WJXX (channel 25), and intended for WBSG to serve as a semi-satellite of WJXX for the northern part of the market. Allbritton had also signed an agreement to switch the affiliations of its television stations not already affiliated with the network to ABC; this agreement was spurred by a 1994 affiliation deal between Fox and New World Communications (which was the owner of Birmingham ABC affiliate WBRC at the time). WJXX signed on the air on February 9, 1997, taking the ABC affiliation from WJKS (channel 17, now CW affiliate WCWJ). On that same day, WBSG dropped the WB affiliation and began carrying most of WJXX's schedule with deviations for channel 21's own local newscasts. The switch was supposed to occur in April 1997. However, when WJKS announced that it would drop the ABC affiliation in February and join The WB, under the callsign WJWB, ABC asked Allbritton to sign on WJXX two months earlier than originally planned.

Allbritton heavily invested in the two stations, including building studio facilities on A.C. Skinner Parkway in Jacksonville. However, WBSG and WJXX failed to gain significant ratings traction in the market. In addition to the early sign-on, the two stations' combined signal footprint was not nearly as large as those of CBS affiliate WJXT (channel 4, now an independent station) and NBC affiliate WTLV (channel 12).

After the FCC legalized television station duopolies on November 15, 1999, Allbritton announced the following day that it would sell WJXX to the Gannett Company, owner of WTLV. WBSG was not included in the sale. When the sale of WJXX to Gannett was finalized in March 2000, Allbritton made WBSG an affiliate of Pax (a forerunner to Ion Television). The network's parent company, Paxson Communications (now Ion Media Networks), bought the station that September, and changed its call letters to WPXC-TV the following year, to reflect the station's new affiliation.

Former translator (WPXJ-LP)
Until September 6, 2013, WPXC-TV was relayed on a low power fill-in analog translator station, WPXJ-LP (channel 41) in Jacksonville. This station was granted a construction permit to operate on UHF channel 59 on November 12, 1986, under the callsign W59BC. A license to cover was issued on July 29, 1988. The station applied to move to UHF channel 41 and became W41BM in 1992. Although the FCC regarded the station as having immediately changed callsigns, the move was not licensed until 1996; a few months later, the station was renamed WDVL-LP.

WDVL was silent by December 1997, when Paxson Communications purchased the station from original owner Jacksonville Translator, Inc. It returned to the air in April 1998 as WPXJ-LP, temporarily carrying programming from Paxson's infomercial network, the Infomail TV Network (inTV) until the launch of Pax TV on August 31. WPXJ was the only Pax station in the market until WBSG-TV's switch to the network and its subsequent acquisition by Paxson in 2000. The station had a construction permit to flash-cut a digital signal into operation on UHF channel 41, which was never constructed. WPXJ-LP left the air on September 6, 2013, due to the expiration of the lease for its transmitter site; on September 9, 2014, its license was canceled by the FCC.

Programming

Newscasts
During its years as an independent station and later as a WB affiliate, WBSG-TV operated a news department; its local newscasts, branded as NewsCenter 21 with half-hour evening newscasts at 6:00, 10:00 and 11:00 p.m., were targeted at Brunswick and southeast Georgia. After it switched to ABC in December 1996, the station cancelled its 10:00 p.m. newscast as the network began running regular primetime programming during that hour. The news department was shut down in December 1997, when WJXX launched its own news operation and Allbritton transferred most of WBSG's news staff to WJXX (during the stations' first months as an ABC affiliate, the two stations split their simulcast at 6:00 and 11:00 p.m., with WBSG continuing its local newscasts while WJXX aired M*A*S*H reruns).

Notable former on-air staff
 Jacque Reid – reporter (later with CNN and BET)

Sports programming
During the 2008 season, WPXC aired Major League Baseball games from the Tampa Bay Devil Rays produced by the team's syndication service, the Rays Television Network. The station also aired NBA games from the Orlando Magic during the 2006–07 season. WPXC lost the broadcast rights to both teams after the teams moved all televised games to regional sports network Fox Sports Florida.

Technical information

Subchannels
The station's digital signal is multiplexed:

Analog-to-digital conversion
On June 12, 2009, WPXC-TV terminated its analog signal, on UHF channel 21, as part of the federally mandated transition from analog to digital television. The station's digital signal remained on its pre-transition UHF channel 24. Through the use of PSIP, digital television receivers display WPXC-TV's virtual channel as 21.

References

External links
Ion Television official website

Ion Television affiliates
Court TV affiliates
Ion Mystery affiliates
Grit (TV network) affiliates
Defy TV affiliates
Laff (TV network) affiliates
Scripps News affiliates
E. W. Scripps Company television stations
Television channels and stations established in 1990
PXC-TV
1990 establishments in Georgia (U.S. state)
Brunswick, Georgia